Magnum II is the eponymous second studio album by the English rock band Magnum. It was released in 1979 on Jet Records. Magnum II followed on from the success of Magnum's debut album, Kingdom of Madness. The album was produced by former Ten Years After bass player Leo Lyons, who had success with producing Phenomenon, Force It and No Heavy Petting for UFO. As with their debut album Kingdom of Madness, much of the material on Magnum II was already written and had already been previewed in Magnum's live set and were suitably "road tested". The album, however failed to chart on its release in October 1979. Both "Changes", released in September 1979, and "Foolish Heart", released in November 1979, were singles.

The 2005 expanded version of the album was reissued on 22 September 2006 in Japan with Mini LP/Paper Sleeve packaging through Arcangelo. The album was also included in a limited edition Japanese Box Set, comprising all six of Sanctuary Records Expanded and Remastered releases with Mini LP/Paper Sleeve packaging. The set included an outer box featuring Magnum's Chase the Dragon artwork.

Track listing

Reissues

Bonus tracks 
In 2005 Sanctuary Records released a 'Remastered and Expanded' edition with bonus tracks.

"Lonesome Star" (Disc 1, 11)
Recorded during the Magnum II sessions, originally released as the B-side to the "Changes" single.

"Changes" (Disc 1, 12)
A remixed version of the album track. Released as a single after the success of Marauder.

"Everybody Needs" (Disc 1, 13)
B-side to the "Changes" remixed single, a re-recording of a demo recorded during Kingdom of Madness sessions.

"Changes" (Disc 1, 14)
B-side to the "Changes" remixed single, recorded live at The Marquee, London. Originally released on Marauder.

"Foolish Heart" (Disc 1, 15)
Released in 1993 on Magnum's acoustic album Keeping the Nite Light Burning.

Singles 
Changes 7" (September 1979)
 "Changes" [LP Version] – 3:15
 "Lonesome Star" [B-Side] – 3:13

Foolish Heart 7" (November 1979)
 "Foolish Heart" [LP Version] – 3:13
 "Baby Rock Me" [LP Version] – 4:05

Personnel 
 Bob Catley — Vocals
 Tony Clarkin – Guitar
 Wally Lowe – Bass
 Richard Bailey – Keyboards, Flute
 Kex Gorin – Drums

Production 
 Produced by Leo Lyons
 Engineered by Rafe McKenna
 Assisted by Paul Hume
 Mastered at Abbey Road Studios by Nic Webb
 Recorded at Music Centre Studios, Wembley

References

External links 
 www.magnumonline.co.uk — Official Magnum site
 Magnum II: Expanded Edition — Sanctuary Records' mini site

Magnum (band) albums
1979 albums
Albums produced by Leo Lyons
Jet Records albums